The Cámara de los Comptos (Spanish: Cámara de los Comptos) is a building located in Pamplona, Spain. It was declared Bien de Interés Cultural in 1868.

References

See also 

 List of Bien de Interés Cultural in Navarre

Bien de Interés Cultural landmarks in Navarre